The 1927 Chicago American Giants baseball team represented the Chicago American Giants in the Negro National League (NNL) during the 1927 baseball season. The team compiled a 61–32–1 record, won the NNL pennant, and defeated the Bacharach Giants in the 1927 Colored World Series. 

Rube Foster was the team's owner, and Dave Malarcher was the player-manager. The team played its home games at Schorling Park in Chicago. 

The team's leading batters were:
 Left fielder Steel Arm Davis - .396 batting average, .545 slugging percentage, 68 RBIs, 14 stolen bases in 84 games
 Catcher James Bray - .326 batting average, .474 slugging percentage in 56 games
 Shortstop Pythias Russ - .325 batting average, .474 slugging percentage, four home runs, 58 RBIs in 86 games

The team's leading pitchers were Willie Foster (21–5, 2.03 ERA, 119 strikeouts) and Willie Powell (12–4, 2.25 ERA).

References

1927 in sports in Illinois
Negro league baseball seasons